The Olivet Comets men's basketball program represents Olivet College in men's basketball at the NCAA Division III level.

List of coaches

 Unknown (1898–1901)
 No team (1901–1905)
 Burt Kennedy (1905–1907)
 No team (1907–1908)
 Brainerd (1908–1909)
 Henry Hall (1909–1911)
 No team (1911–1912)
 Henry Hall (1912–1913)
 Lancaster (1913–1914)
 George Rider (1914–1915)
 No team (1915–1916)
 Unknown (1916–1919)
 No team (1919–1920)
 Ernest Watson (1920–1922)
 No team (1922–1923)
 George Johnson (1923–1924)
 Joe Shafer (1924–1926)
 Alvin Cassell (1926–1928)
 Walter Sprandel (1928–1942)
 No team (1942–1946)
 Frank Ham (1946–1952)
 Vaughn Snook (1952–1953)
 Warren Thomas (1953–1956)
 Della Guistina (1956–1957)
 Henry Paul (1957–1960)
 Eugene Anderson (1960–1964)
 Vincent Sigren (1964–1965)
 Eugene Anderson (1965–1967)
 Gary Morrison (1967–1997)
 Steve Hettinga (1997–2004)
 Kurt Soderberg (2004–2007)
 Gene Gifford (2007–2012)
 Chris Coles (2012–2016)
 Steve Ernst  (2016–2019)
 Sam Hargraves  (2019–present)

References

External links
 

 
Basketball teams established in 1899
1899 establishments in Michigan